John Parry-Gordon (17 February 1945 – 3 November 2009) was an English professional rugby league footballer who played in the 1960s, 1970s and 1980s.

Background
Gordon was born in Wigan, Lancashire, although being known as Parry Gordon his first name was actually John, Parry being his mother's maiden surname, and he died aged 64 in Warrington, Cheshire, England.

Club career
Gordon signed for Warrington on his 16th birthday for a fee of £400, and he made his début for Warrington on Saturday 26 October 1963, and he played his last match for Warringon on Sunday 13 September 1981. With 543 appearances, Parry Gordon is second in Warrington's 'Most Appearances In A Career' list behind Brian Bevan, who had 620 appearances, and ahead of Jack 'Cod' Miller, who had 526 appearances.

Premiership Final appearances
Gordon played in Warrington's 13-12 victory over St. Helens in the Premiership Final during the 1973–74 season at Central Park, Wigan on Saturday 18 May 1974.

Challenge Cup Final appearances
Gordon played  in Warrington's 24-9 victory over Featherstone Rovers in the 1974 Challenge Cup Final during the 1973–74 season at Wembley Stadium, London on Saturday 11 May 1974, in front of a crowd of 77,400, and played  in the 7-14 defeat by Widnes in the 1975 Challenge Cup Final during the 1974–75 season at Wembley Stadium, London on Saturday 10 May 1975, in front of a crowd of 85,998.

County Cup Final appearances
Gordon played  in Warrington's 2-2 draw with St. Helens in the 1967 Lancashire County Cup Final during the 1967–68 season at Central Park, Wigan on Saturday 7 October 1967, and played , and scored a try in the 10-13 defeat by St. Helens in the 1967 Lancashire County Cup Final replay during the 1967–68 season at Station Road, Swinton on Saturday 2 December 1967.

BBC2 Floodlit Trophy Final appearances
Gordon played  in Warrington's 0-0 draw with Salford in the 1974 BBC2 Floodlit Trophy Final during the 1974–75 season at The Willows, Salford on Tuesday 17 December 1974, and played  in the 5-10 defeat by Salford in the 1974 BBC2 Floodlit Trophy Final replay during the 1974–75 season at Wilderspool Stadium, Warrington on Tuesday 28 January 1975.

Player's No.6 Trophy Final appearances
Gordon played  in Warrington's 27-16 victory over Rochdale Hornets in the 1973–74 Player's No.6 Trophy Final during the 1973–74 season at Central Park, Wigan on Saturday 9 February 1974, played  in the 9-4 victory over Widnes in the 1977–78 Players No.6 Trophy Final during the 1977–78 season at Knowsley Road, St. Helens on Saturday 28 January 1978, and played  in  the 14-16 defeat by Widnes in the 1978–79 John Player Trophy Final during the 1977–78 season at Knowsley Road, St. Helens on Saturday 28 April 1979.

Captain Morgan Trophy Final appearances
Gordon played  in Warrington's 4-0 victory over Featherstone Rovers in the 1973–74 Captain Morgan Trophy Final during the 1973–74 season at The Willows, Salford on Saturday 26 January 1974, in front of a crowd of 5,259.

Testimonial match
Gordon's Testimonial match at Warrington took place in 1981.

Representative career

International honours
Gordon won a cap for England while at Warrington in 1975 against Papua New Guinea (interchange/substitute). He was also selected for the England squad for the 1975 Rugby League World Cup. However, he did not participate in any of the nine matches.

He never played for Great Britain during his career, and is often regarded as one of the best scrum halves never to have been capped by the team.

County honours
Gordon won seven caps for Lancashire while at Warrington.

Honoured at Warrington Wolves
Gordon is a Warrington Wolves Hall of Fame inductee.

References

External links
Statistics at wolvesplayers.thisiswarrington.co.uk

1945 births
2009 deaths
England national rugby league team players
English rugby league players
Lancashire rugby league team players
People from Ince-in-Makerfield
Rugby league halfbacks
Rugby league players from Wigan
Warrington Wolves players